The Logistics Vehicle System (LVS), nicknamed by U.S. Marines as "Dragon Wagon", is a modular assortment of eight-wheel drive all-terrain vehicle unit combinations used by the United States Marine Corps.

The LVS was fielded in 1985 as the Marine Corps heavy tactical vehicle system. It was designed and manufactured by the Oshkosh Corporation. The United States Army does not use the LVS, it uses the Heavy Expanded Mobility Tactical Truck (HEMTT). The key differences between the two is the LVS's ability to interchange Front Power Units with Rear Body Units. The LVS also steers through both standard wheel pivoting (as on a typical automobile) and hydraulic yaw steering (by articulating the Front Power Unit against the Rear Body Unit). This enabled the LVS to meet the turning radius requirements of the U.S. Marines.

The Oshkosh Logistic Vehicle System Replacement (LVSR) is the replacement for the LVS and was first fielded in 2009.

Description

The LVS is composed of a Front Power Unit (FPU) coupled to a Rear Body Unit (RBU). The FPU can be driven on its own. When describing a truck it is remarked by the combination of both units, for example, an MK48 FPU attached to an MK18 RBU is called a "48/18". For MK16's, which tow M870 semi-trailers, the type of trailer is added as well, i.e. "48/16/870A2".

 Front Power Units
 MK48: houses a turbocharged 729 cubic inch, 450 hp Detroit Diesel V8, mated to a four-speed Allison transmission. The MK48 also houses the cab, for a crew of two.
 MK48A1: offers slight improvements to the original MK48. Those improvements include a revised battery box and cover, an extra cab entry step for both sides, modified air intake cover, and added handles and steps to ease climbing on top of the power unit.

 Rear Body Units
The MK14 can hold a single twenty-foot equivalent unit (TEU) sized container, or three SIXCON units (pump or tank modules). There are also accommodations for tie-down hooks and ratchet straps for securing cargo. When equipped with a tow bar, two MK14s can be joined and towed by a single MK48 power unit. This is referred to as a "Tandem Tow" or "TT".
 MK15: Recovery vehicle capable of recovering LVSs, MTVRs and Humvees.
 MK16: Fifth-wheel is designed to tow the M870 family of semi-trailers. It is the shortest of the FPU/RBU combinations, creating a smaller turning radius. This is useful, as when towing an M870 trailer, it becomes the Marine Corps' longest tactical vehicle.
 MK17: Material Handling Crane (MHC), which features a slightly shorter flatbed than the MK14. This is to accommodate the MHC at the rear of the unit. The MK17 can also be fitted with benches to carry 20 combat-loaded Marines. This is rare however, as personnel transport is now mainly handled by MTVRs and HMMWVs.
 MK18/18A1: Self-loader capable of loading ribbon bridges, small boats, containers, and SIXCON modules with no external heavy-equipment support. The 18A1 features improvements to the loading and offloading process. The 18A1 features a prominent "stick-figure"–shaped Front Lift Adapter (FLA) rising from the middle of the vehicle.

Specifications

 System-Wide Specifications

Operators

See also

 Heavy Equipment Transport System
 Heavy Expanded Mobility Tactical Truck
 List of vehicles of the United States Marine Corps
 Medium Tactical Vehicle Replacement
 Oshkosh Corporation
 Oshkosh L-ATV
 Oshkosh Logistic Vehicle System Replacement (LVSR)
 Oshkosh M-ATV
 TerraMax (vehicle)
 United States Marine Corps

References

 Headquarters Marine Corps Factfile
 Logistics Vehicle System (LVS) by Federation of American Scientists
 Logistics Vehicle System Replacement (LVSR) by Federation of American Scientists
 Additional information for the LVS at GlobalSecurity.org
 Additional information for the LVSR at GlobalSecurity.org
 Additional Maintenance Information

External links 

 Manufacturer's Website
 LVS Logistic Vehicle System Maintenance Manuals
 LVS and MILITARY VEHICLE INFORMATION FORUM

Military logistics of the United States
Military vehicles introduced in the 1980s
Oshkosh vehicles
United States Marine Corps equipment